Meridian Records is a British independent record label based in London.  Having been founded in 1977, Meridian has celebrated more than a third of a century of recording classical music in its well regarded 'natural sound'.

Meridian has traditionally specialised in recording relatively unknown works and/or artists at the beginning of their careers. Accordingly, it has played an important part in creating the early reputations of musicians as diverse as The Sixteen, solo and chamber pianist Christine Croshaw, clarinetist Anna Hashimoto, tenor Ian Partridge, pianist John Bingham, the Lindsay Quartet, Onyx Brass, and organist David Sanger, among others. Distinguished musicians from all over the globe have recorded on the label, including a series of releases by pianist Fou Ts'ong ("the greatest living Chinese performer" according to Timeout magazine), as well as South African virtuoso double-bassist Leon Bosch - a favourite on Classic FM, BBC Radio 3 and Radio 4.

Meridian has also played a role in educating those who want to get into the classical music recording business, being one of the earliest record labels to pioneer a training and internship scheme at its Greenwich base.

See also
 List of record labels

References

External links
 Website

Record labels established in 1977
Classical music record labels
British independent record labels
1977 establishments in England
British companies established in 1977
Companies based in London